The 2008 Melbourne Storm season was the 11th in the club's history. They competed in the NRL's 2008 Telstra Premiership and finished the regular season as minor premiers before reaching the grand final in which they were beaten by the Manly-Warringah Sea Eagles 40–0, the largest margin in grand final history. The minor premiership won by the Storm in 2008 was later stripped by the NRL in 2010 when it was revealed the club had been in breach of salary cap rules.

Despite losing seven games, Storm managed to finish in top spot on the NRL ladder for a third successive season. They had to wait until the final game to do it though, defeating South Sydney 42–4. A loss to the Warriors in the Qualifying final meant Storm had to do it the hard way and they did just that, defeating the Broncos and Sharks on the road. That tough road eventually caught up with Melbourne in the decider, which they lost to Manly.

Matt Geyer became the first Storm player to reach 250 games while Billy Slater followed on from Cameron Smith the previous year, earning the Golden boot award as the best player in the world.

Season Summary
 World Club Challenge – With club captain Cameron Smith back home to be present at the birth of his first child, Melbourne go down 11–4 to Leeds Rhinos in the 2008 World Club Challenge at a rain-swept Elland Road. Ryan Hoffman scored the only try for Melbourne.
 Round 1 – Billy Slater scores a hat-trick as Melbourne begins their title defence with a 32-18 opening round victory over the New Zealand Warriors at the Telstra Dome. A twice tardy Melbourne are fined $10,000 by the NRL for failing to take the field on time.
 Round 2 – Melbourne  forward Brett White and Cronulla forward Ben Ross are both sent off. Ross is sent off for striking Cooper Cronk with a late elbow, while White is sent off for punching Ross in the ensuing fight. White is later suspended for four matches. The 17–16 defeat ends the clubs 15-match winning streak at Olympic Park.
 Round 3 – Storm experience successive losses for the first time since 2006 as the Sydney Roosters upset Melbourne 10–6.
 30 March – 2007 Dally M Rookie of the Year Israel Folau announces he is leaving Melbourne at the end of the 2008 season, signing a four-year deal with Brisbane Broncos reportedly worth $1.6m.
 18 April – Coach Craig Bellamy signs a new contract extension, keeping him at the club until the end of the 2013 NRL season.
 Round 5 – A man of the match performance from Billy Slater, sees Melbourne defeat Manly 26–4 in the Grand Final rematch at Olympic Park. 
 Round 6 – Wearing replica 1998 home jerseys, Melbourne stage a second half comeback to defeat Canberra Raiders 23–16, after trailing 16–4 at halftime. Aiden Tolman makes his NRL debut with Melbourne, becoming the first player in the club's history to graduate from playing in the NRL Under-20s competition, which was in its inaugural season.
 28 May – Michael Crocker announces he will be leaving the club at the completion of the 2008 season, signing a three-year deal with Super League's Hull F.C.
 Round 10 – Missing nine players to State of Origin selection, as well as coach Craig Bellamy, St George Illawarra snap Melbourne's five-match winning streak.
 Round 11 – With club stalwart Matt Geyer playing his 250th first grade game, Melbourne outlast South Sydney Rabbitohs 15–10 at Gosford, as eight players back up from the midweek Origin fixture.
 Round 12 – Storm hold the Bulldogs scoreless in a 46–0 win, with Cameron Smith scoring 18 points.
 Round 13 – With Origin again ruining team selections, Melbourne missing ten players are held scoreless 18–0 against the Gold Coast Titans. It's the first time since the 2003 NRL finals that Melbourne are held scoreless.
 Round 16 – Again missing nine players (and coach Craig Bellamy), Melbourne struggle against Parramatta Eels, losing 24–22. Previously Parramatta had not defeated Melbourne since 2005.
 Round 17 – A dominant Greg Inglis leads Melbourne to a 30–14 win over Canberra at Olympic Park. The victory marking Craig Bellamy's 100th coaching victory at premiership level (from 147 games).
 Round 19 – A wild brawl in the 23rd minute saw Billy Slater and Adam Blair sin binned, while minutes later Jason Ryles was sent off by referee Gavin Badger as Melbourne defeated St George Illawarra 26–0.
 Round 20 – Michael Crocker experiences defeat for the first time in a Melbourne jersey, with the Warriors 8–6 win over the Storm. Crocker had played 34 games since joining the Storm without tasting defeat.
 30 July –  Cooper Cronk re-signs with the club for a further five seasons.
 27 August – The Sydney Morning Herald reports that NRL CEO David Gallop held secret talks with Greg Inglis to ensure he did follow other players in 'defecting' to rugby union.
 Round 26 – Melbourne claim their third straight minor premiership, defeating South Sydney 42–4 in the final match of the regular season. Level on competition points with Manly, Melbourne took the J. J. Giltinan Shield with a superior points differential (+302 versus +290). In his final home game at Olympic Park, Matt Geyer scored the first try of the match and was honoured with a special presentation at full time.
 9 September – Billy Slater and Cameron Smith finish in a tie for second for the Dally M Medal behind former Storm halfback Matt Orford. Slater's suspension for fighting in Round 19 costs him the victory.
 10 September – Despite strong interest from European rugby union clubs, Greg Inglis commits his future to the Storm, signing a new four-year contract reportedly worth $1.8m.
 Semi Final – In a pulsating match in front of over 50,000 fans at Suncorp Stadium, Melbourne score a last minute try to win 16–14 over the Brisbane Broncos. Forwards Jeremy Smith and Cameron Smith are cited for a tackle on Sam Thaiday during the second half. Jeremy Smith later accepts a one-match suspension, while Cameron Smith pleads not guilty to a charge of unnecessary contact to the head or neck. In a lengthy NRL judiciary hearing, Cameron Smith is suspended for two-matches, ruling him out of the rest of the season.
 Preliminary Final – After Melbourne's comfortable 28–0 win over Cronulla, coach Craig Bellamy launches into a long-winded attack on the NRL, the NRL judiciary, bookmakers, and the media following the suspension of Cameron Smith. Bellamy's comments, endorsed by club CEO Brian Waldron, result in the NRL fining the club $50,000 with NRL CEO David Gallop accusing the pair of an "unprecedented, irrational, premeditated and defamatory attack on the integrity of the judiciary panel and the game's judiciary process."
 30 September – The Men of League charity announce the game's greatest club players at their annual ball, with Cameron Smith named as Melbourne's club great.

Milestone games

Jerseys

Apparel supplier Reebok kept the same home jersey design as worn in previous seasons. The clash jersey changed to a mostly white jersey, featuring purple shoulder stripes and side panels together with sublimated purple thunderbolts, worn with purple shorts and white socks with two purple stripes. An alternate jersey was worn in the NRL's heritage round, with Melbourne wearing a replica uniform combination similar to their 1998 home colours.

In line with the celebrations of the centenary of rugby league in Australia, an additional patch was worn above the NRL logo.

Fixtures

Pre season

Regular season
Source:
(GP) – Golden Point extra time
(pen) – Penalty try

Finals

Ladder

2008 Coaching Staff
 Head coach: Craig Bellamy
 Assistant coaches: Michael Maguire & Stephen Kearney
 Specialist coach: Matthew Johns
 Strength and conditioning Coach: Alex Corvo
 Football Manager: Frank Ponissi
 NRL Under 20s Coach: Brad Arthur
 Feeder Club Coach: Jamie Feeney (Central Coast Storm)

2008 squad
List current as of 3 November 2021

Player movements

Losses
 James Aubusson to Sydney Roosters
 Ben Cross to Newcastle Knights
 Garret Crossman to Hull Kingston Rovers
 Matt King to Warrington Wolves
 Clint Newton to Hull Kingston Rovers
 Matt Rua to Retirement
 Ryan Shortland to New Zealand Warriors

Gains
 Brett Anderson from North Queensland Cowboys
 Clifford Manua from Brisbane Broncos
 Dane Nielsen from Cronulla-Sutherland Sharks

Representative honours
This table lists all players who have played a representative match in 2008.

Statistics
This table contains playing statistics for all Melbourne Storm players to have played in the 2008 NRL season.

Statistics sources:

Scorers

Most points in a game: 18 points
 Round 12 – Cameron Smith (1 try, 7 goals) vs Canterbury-Bankstown Bulldogs

Most tries in a game: 3 
 Round 1 – Billy Slater vs New Zealand Warriors
 Round 4 – Anthony Quinn vs Brisbane Broncos
 Round 15 – Greg Inglis vs North Queensland Cowboys
 Round 18 – Greg Inglis vs Wests Tigers
 Round 24 – Greg Inglis vs Penrith Panthers

Winning games

Highest score in a winning game: 48 points 
 Round 15 vs North Queensland Cowboys

Lowest score in a winning game: 15 points
 Round 11 vs South Sydney Rabbitohs

Greatest winning margin: 46 points 
 Round 12 vs Canterbury-Bankstown Bulldogs

Greatest number of games won consecutively: 5
 Round 4 – Round 9

Losing games

Highest score in a losing game: 22 points
 Round 16 vs Parramatta Eels

Lowest score in a losing game: 0 points 
 Round 13 vs Gold Coast Titans
 Grand Final vs Manly Warringah Sea Eagles

Greatest losing margin: 40 points
 Grand Final vs Manly Warringah Sea Eagles

Greatest number of games lost consecutively: 2 
 Round 2 – Round 3

NRL Under 20s

For the first time since the formation of the NRL in 1998, every team fielded a team in the same second-tier competition, guaranteeing fans a high standard curtain raiser before every NRL game. The National Youth Championships (known commercially as the Toyota Cup due to sponsorship from Toyota Australia) ran parallel to the NRL. Similar to the NRL, the NYC enforces a salary cap and puts a heavy focus on life outside football for the players.

In the competition's inaugural season, Melbourne were coached by Brad Arthur finished in 13th position, failing to make the finals. Melbourne used 28 players across the season, with five players (Liam Foran, Sam Joe, Kevin Proctor, Joe Tomane, and Aiden Tolman) also making NRL appearances in 2008.

Ladder

Statistics
Source:

Scorers
Most points in a game: 16 points
 Round 1 – Joe Tomane (2 tries, 4 goals) vs New Zealand Warriors
 Round 9 – Trent Walker (4 tries) vs Newcastle Knights

Most tries in a game: 4 
 Round 9 – Trent Walker vs Newcastle Knights

Most points (season): 106
 Liam Foran (3 tries, 47 goals)

Most tries (season): 13
 Sam Joe

Winning games
Highest score in a winning game: 36 points 
 Round 17 vs Canberra Raiders

Lowest score in a winning game: 22 points
 Round 5 vs Manly Warringah Sea Eagles

Greatest winning margin: 24 points 
 Round 9 vs Newcastle Knights

Greatest number of games won consecutively: 2
 Round 4 – Round 5
 Round 22 – Round 23

Losing games
Highest score in a losing game: 32 points
 Round 3 vs Sydney Roosters

Lowest score in a losing game: 6 points 
 Round 7 vs North Queensland Cowboys
 Round 13 vs Gold Coast Titans

Greatest losing margin: 32 points
 Round 6 vs Canberra Raiders
 Round 13 vs Gold Coast Titans

Greatest number of games lost consecutively: 4 
 Round 18 – Round 21

Feeder Team
Established in 2007 and coached by former Storm player Jamie Feeney, Melbourne sent their back-up players to play with Central Coast Storm, with home games played at Morry Breen Oval, the base of Central Coast team Wyong Roos.

Central Coast missed the finals, finishing in 10th position (out of 12 teams). The Player of the Year award was won by former Newcastle Knights player Reegan Tanner.

Awards

Trophy Cabinet
2008 J. J. Giltinan Shield

Melbourne Storm Awards Night
 Melbourne Storm Player of the Year: Billy Slater 
 Members' Player of the Year: Billy Slater
 Best Back: Cooper Cronk
 Best Forward: Jeff Lima
 Most Improved: Sika Manu
 Rookie of the Year: Aiden Tolman
 Darren Bell U20s Player of the Year Award: Louis Fanene
 U20s Most Improved: Pulou Vaituutuu
 U20s Best Forward: Zeb Tawha
 U20s Best Back: Luke Kelly
 Mick Moore Club Person of the Year: Samantha Shaw
 Life Member Inductee: Dallas Johnson

Dally M Awards Night
Dally M Representative Player of the Year: Greg Inglis 
Dally M Hooker of the Year: Cameron Smith
Dally M Centre of the Year: Israel Folau
Dally M Five-Eighth of the Year: Greg Inglis
Dally M Fullback of the Year: Billy Slater
 NRL Hall of Fame Inductee: Glenn Lazarus

Rugby League World Golden Boot Awards Night
 Golden Boot Award: Billy Slater

RLPA Awards Night
RLPA Australia Representative Player of the Year: Billy Slater

RLIF Awards
RLIF Player of the Year: Billy Slater
RLIF Rookie of the Year: Israel Folau
RLIF Fullback of the Year: Billy Slater
RLIF Centre of the Year: Israel Folau
RLIF Five-Eighth of the Year: Greg Inglis
RLIF Hooker of the Year: Cameron Smith

Notes

References

Melbourne Storm seasons
Melbourne Storm